The Sultanate of Mogadishu (fl.9th- 13th centuries), also known as the Kingdom of Magadazo, was a medieval Somali sultanate centered in southern Somalia. It rose as one of the pre-eminent powers in the Horn of Africa under the rule of Fakhr al-Din before becoming part of the powerful and expanding Ajuran Empire in the 13th century. The Mogadishu Sultanate maintained a vast trading network, dominated the regional gold trade, minted its own currency, and left an extensive architectural legacy in present-day southern Somalia.

Ethnicity

The ethnic origins of the founders of Mogadishu and its subsequent sultanate has been the subject of much debate in Somali Studies. I.M Lewis postulates that the city was founded and ruled by a council of Arab and Persian families. It has now been widely accepted that there were already existing communities on the Somali coast with local African leadership, to whom the Arab and Persian families had to ask for permission to settle in their cities. Ibn Battuta also stated that the natives of Mogadishu were dark-skinned.

This is corroborated by the 1st century AD Greek document the Periplus of the Erythraean Sea, detailing multiple prosperous port cities in ancient Somalia, as well as the identification of ancient Sarapion with the city that would later be known as Mogadishu. When Ibn Battuta visited the Sultanate in the 14th century, he identified the Sultan as being of Barbara origin, an ancient term to describe the ancestors of the Somali people. According to Ross E. Dunn neither Mogadishu, or any other city on the coast could be considered alien enclaves of Arabs or Persians, but were in-fact African towns.

History

Mogadishu Sultanate
For many years Mogadishu functioned as the pre-eminent city in the بلد البربر (Bilad al Barbar - "Land of the Berbers"), as medieval Arabic-speakers named the Somali coast. Following his visit to the city, the 12th-century Syrian historian Yaqut al-Hamawi (a former slave of Greek origin) wrote a global history of many places he visited including Mogadishu and called it the richest and most powerful city in the region and described it as an Islamic center on the Indian Ocean.

Mongol expedition to Mogadishu

In the 13th century, the Sultanate of Mogadishu through its trade with medieval China had acquired enough of a reputation in Asia to attract the attention of Kublai Khan. According to Marco Polo, the Mongol Emperor sent an envoy to Mogadishu to spy out the sultanate but the delegation was captured and imprisoned. Kublai Khan then sent another envoy to treat for the release of the earlier Mongol delegation sent to Africa.

Archaeological excavations have recovered many coins from China, Sri Lanka, and Vietnam. The majority of the Chinese coins date to the Song dynasty, although the Ming dynasty and Qing dynasty "are also represented," according to Richard Pankhurst.

Ajuran Sultanate

In the early 13th century, Mogadishu along with other coastal and interior Somali cities in southern Somalia and eastern Abyissina came under the Ajuran Sultanate control and experienced another Golden Age. By the 1500s, Mogadishu was no longer a vassal state and became a full-fledged city under the ajuran. An Ajuran family, Muduffar, established a dynasty in the city, thus combining two entities together for the next 350 years, the fortunes of the urban cities in the interior and coast became the fortunes of the other.

During his travels, Ibn Sa'id al-Maghribi (1213–1286) noted that Mogadishu city had already become the leading Islamic center in the region. By the time of the Moroccan traveller Ibn Battuta's appearance on the Somali coast in 1331, the city was at the zenith of its prosperity. He described Mogadishu as "an exceedingly large city" with many rich merchants, which was famous for its high quality fabric that it exported to Egypt, among other places. He also describes the hospitality of the people of Mogadishu and how locals would put travelers up in their home to help the local economy. Battuta added that the city was ruled by a Somali sultan, Abu Bakr ibn Shaikh 'Umar, who had a Barbara origin, an ancient term to describe the ancestors of the Somali people. and spoke the Mogadishan Somali or Banadiri Somali (referred to by Battuta as Benadir) and Arabic with equal fluency. The sultan also had a retinue of wazirs (ministers), legal experts, commanders, royal eunuchs, and other officials at his beck and call. Ibn Khaldun (1332 to 1406) noted in his book that Mogadishu was a massive metropolis. He also claimed that the city was a very populous with many wealthy merchants.

This period gave birth to notable figures like Abd al-Aziz of Mogadishu who was described as the governor and island chief of Maldives by Ibn Battuta After him is named the Abdul-Aziz Mosque in Mogadishu which has remained there for centuries.

Duarte Barbosa, the famous Portuguese traveler wrote about Mogadishu (c 1517–1518):

The Sultanate of Mogadishu sent ambassadors to China to establish diplomatic ties, creating the first ever recorded African community in China and the most notable was Sa'id of Mogadishu who was the first African man to set foot in China. In return, Emperor Yongle, the third emperor of the Ming dynasty (1368-1644), dispatched one of the largest fleets in Chinese history to trade with the sultanate. The fleet, under the leadership of the famed Hui Muslim Zheng He, arrived at Mogadishu, while the city was at its zenith. Along with gold, frankincense and fabrics, Zheng brought back the first ever African wildlife to China, which included hippos, giraffes and gazelles.

Vasco Da Gama, who passed by Mogadishu in the 15th century, noted that it was a large city with houses of four or five storeys high and big palaces in its centre and many mosques with cylindrical minarets. In the 16th century, Duarte Barbosa noted that many ships from the Kingdom of Cambaya sailed to Mogadishu with cloths and spices for which they in return received gold, wax and ivory. Barbosa also highlighted the abundance of meat, wheat, barley, horses, and fruit on the coastal markets, which generated enormous wealth for the merchants. Mogadishu, the center of a thriving weaving industry known as toob benadir (specialized for the markets in Egypt and Syria), together with Merca and Barawa also served as transit stops for Swahili merchants from Mombasa and Malindi and for the gold trade from Kilwa. Jewish merchants from the Hormuz also brought their Indian textile and fruit to the Somali coast in exchange for grain and wood.

In 1542, the Portuguese commander João de Sepúvelda led a small fleet on an expedition to the Somali coast. During this expedition he briefly attacked Mogadishu, capturing an Ottoman ship and firing upon the city, which compelled the sultan of Mogadishu to sign a peace treaty with the Portuguese.

According to the 16th-century explorer, Leo Africanus indicates that the native inhabitants of the Mogadishu polity were of the same origins as the denizens of the northern people of Zeila the capital of Adal Sultanate. They were generally tall with an olive skin complexion, with some being darker. They would wear traditional rich white silk wrapped around their bodies and have Islamic turbans and coastal people would only wear sarongs, and spoke Arabic as a lingua franca. Their weaponry consisted of traditional Somali weapons such as swords, daggers, spears, battle axe, and bows, although they received assistance from its close ally the Ottoman Empire and with the import of firearms such as muskets and cannons. Most were Muslims, although a few adhered to heathen bedouin tradition; there were also a number of Abyssinian Christians further inland. Mogadishu itself was a wealthy, and well-built city-state, which maintained commercial trade with kingdoms across the world. The metropolis city was surrounded by walled stone fortifications.

Trade

Somali merchants from Mogadishu established a colony in Mozambique to extract gold from the mines in Sofala. During the 9th century, Mogadishu minted its own Mogadishu currency for its medieval trading empire in the Indian Ocean. It centralized its commercial hegemony by minting coins to facilitate regional trade. The currency bore the names of the 13 successive sultans of Mogadishu. The oldest pieces date back to 923-24 and on the front bear the name of Imsail ibn Muhahamad, the then sultan of Mogadishu. On the back of the coins, the names of the four Caliphs of the Rashidun Caliphate are inscribed. Other coins were also minted in the style of the extant Fatimid and the Ottoman currencies. Mogadishan coins were in widespread circulation. Pieces have been found as far away as modern United Arab Emirates, where a coin bearing the name of a 12th-century Somali sultan Ali b. Yusuf of Mogadishu was excavated. Bronze pieces belonging to the sultans of Mogadishu have also been found at Belid near Salalah in Dhofar.

Upon arrival in Mogadishu's harbour, it was custom for small boats to approach the arriving vessel, and their occupants to offer food and hospitality to the merchants on the ship. If a merchant accepted such an offer, then he was obligated to lodge in that person's house and to accept their services as sales agent for whatever business they transacted in Mogadishu. Zheng He, the famous Chinese traveler obtained zebra and lions from Mogadishu and camels and ostriches from Barawa.

Sultans of Mogadishu

The various sultans of Mogadishu are mainly known from the Mogadishan currency on which many of their names are engraved. A private collection of coins found in Mogadishu revealed a minimum of 23 sultans. The founder of the sultanate was reportedly Fakhr ad-Din, who was the first sultan of Mogadishu and founder of the Fakhr ad-Din dynasty. While only a handful of the pieces have been precisely dated, the Mogadishu Sultanate's first coins were minted at the beginning of the 13th century, with the last issued around the early 17th century. For trade, the Ajuran Sultanate also utilized the Mogadishan currency who became allied to the Muzaffar dynasty of Mogadishu at the end of the 16th century. Mogadishan coins have been found as far away as the present-day country of the United Arab Emirates in the Middle East. The following list of the sultans of Mogadishu is abridged and is primarily derived from these mints. The first of two dates uses the Islamic calendar, with the second using the Julian calendar; single dates are based on the Julian (European) calendar.

References

Somali empires
Former sultanates in the medieval Horn of Africa
9th-century establishments in Africa
14th-century disestablishments in Africa
Sultanate of Mogadishu
Medieval Somalia